The 2022 Indian Premier League, also known as IPL 15 or for sponsorship reasons, TATA IPL 2022, was the fifteenth season of the Indian Premier League (IPL), a professional Twenty20 cricket league established by the Board of Control for Cricket in India (BCCI) in 2007. The tournament was played from 26 March 2022 to 29 May 2022. The group stage of the tournament was played entirely in the state of Maharashtra, with Mumbai and Pune hosting matches.

The season saw the expansion of the league with the addition of two new franchises. Chennai Super Kings were the defending champions, having won their fourth title during the previous season.

In the final one of the new franchises, Gujarat Titans, beat Rajasthan Royals by seven wickets to win their first title.

Background
Although earlier reports suggested the addition of two more teams in the previous season, the BCCI delayed the expansion of the league until 2022. In August 2021, it was confirmed that two new franchises would join the league in 2022, with a shortlist of locations including Ahmedabad, Cuttack, Dharamshala, Guwahati, Indore and Lucknow.

In a closed bidding auction held in October 2021, RPSG Group and CVC Capital won the right to the two new franchises. The Lucknow team was named as Lucknow Super Giants in January 2022, and the Ahmedabad team was named as Gujarat Titans the following month.

Vivo pulled out as the title sponsor of the tournament on 11 January 2022, having previously withdrawn as sponsors in 2020 and later signing a contract until 2023. The Tata Group was later named as the replacement title sponsor for the remainder of Vivo's contract.

Personnel changes

Each existing team was allowed to retain a maximum of four players, with the two new teams were allowed to select a maximum of three players before the auction. The retained players of the existing eight teams were announced on 30 November 2021, and the two new teams named their selections on 22 January 2022.

The player auction to complete team squads took place on 12 and 13 February 2022 in Bangalore.

Format
With the introduction of the new teams, a ten-team format was created, consisting of 74 matches. The ten teams were divided into two groups of five. In the group stage, each team plays 14 games: facing the other four teams in their group twice, both home and away, four teams from the other group once, and the remaining team from the other group twice. The groups for the tournament were announced on 25 February 2022. The format is similar to the one used in 2011, although in 2022 the teams were drawn into groups according to seedings instead of being drawn randomly.

Venues
Three venues in Mumbai and one in Pune hosted the league stage matches. The original schedule for the tournament had 20 matches each at the Wankhede Stadium and the DY Patil Stadium in Mumbai, with Mumbai's Brabourne Stadium and the MCA International Stadium in Pune hosting 15 matches each. Every team were scheduled to play four matches each at the Wankhede Stadium and the DY Patil Stadium, and three matches each at the Brabourne Stadium and the MCA Stadium

Due to COVID-19 cases within the Delhi Capitals camp, two matches were relocated from the MCA International Stadium in Pune.

Points Table

Match summary

League stage 

The schedule for the group stages was published on the official IPL website on 6 March 2022.

Matches

Playoffs
The final took place on 29 May 2022. The full schedule for the playoffs was announced on 23 April 2022.

Preliminary 

Qualifier 1

Eliminator

Qualifier 2

Final

Statistics and awards

Most runs 

  Orange Cap

Most wickets 

  Purple Cap

End of the season awards

Source:

References

[IPL 2023 Match No 1, Chennai Super Kings (CSK) vs Gujarat Titans (GT) : Dream11 Team, Scorecard, Head-To-Head, Winning Prediction & Match Report]

External links

[IPL 2023 Match No 1, Chennai Super Kings (CSK) vs Gujarat Titans (GT) : Dream11 Team, Scorecard, Head-To-Head, Winning Prediction & Match Report]

[IPL 2023 Match No 1, Chennai Super Kings (CSK) vs Gujarat Titans (GT) : Dream11 Team, Scorecard, Head-To-Head, Winning Prediction & Match Report]

2022 Indian Premier League
[IPL 2023 Match No 1, Chennai Super Kings (CSK) vs Gujarat Titans (GT) : Dream11 Team, Scorecard, Head-To-Head, Winning Prediction & Match Report]
Indian Premier League seasons
Domestic cricket competitions in 2021–22
2022 in Indian cricket
Maharashtra
Mumbai
Pune
[IPL 2023 Match No 1, Chennai Super Kings (CSK) vs Gujarat Titans (GT) : Dream11 Team, Scorecard, Head-To-Head, Winning Prediction & Match Report]